The nave is the central approach to the high altar, the main body of the church, in Romanesque and Gothic Christian abbey, cathedral basilica and church architecture. "Nave" (Medieval Latin navis, "ship") was probably suggested by the keel shape of its vaulting.  The nave of a church, whether Romanesque, Gothic or Classical, extends from the entry (which may have a separate vestibule, the narthex) to the chancel and is flanked by lower aisles separated from the nave by an arcade.

Note: The lower part of the list probably has many missing cathedrals. For example, St Patrick's Cathedral Melbourne – 24.3 metres

See also
 Description of the term "nave"
 List of largest churches
 List of tallest churches
 List of tallest domes

Notes
a.
b.

References

Naves, tallest
Church naves, tallest
Naves, tallest
Church naves, tallest
Church, naves

he:רשימת הקתדרלות בעלות הספינות הראשיות הגבוהות ביותר